FK Jedinstvo Paraćin is a football club based in Paraćin, Serbia. They compete in the Serbian League East, the third tier of the national league system.

History
The club qualified for the Yugoslav Cup in the 1984–85 season. They defeated Sloboda Tuzla on penalties in the opening round, before losing 5–0 away to Hajduk Split in the next phase.

The club won the Serbian League East in the 1994–95 season and took promotion to the Second League of FR Yugoslavia. They spent two seasons in the second tier of FR Yugoslavia football. Despite suffering relegation to the third tier in 1996–97, the club achieved one of its best results in history by reaching the FR Yugoslavia Cup semi-finals that season, losing 1–0 on aggregate to Vojvodina. They would spend four more consecutive seasons in the second tier between 1998 and 2002.

Honours
Serbian League East / Serbian League Timok (Tier 3)
 1994–95 / 1997–98
Pomoravlje Zone League / Zone League West (Tier 4)
 2003–04 / 2015–16

Seasons

Notable players
This is a list of players who have played at full international level.
  Filip Kasalica
  Nenad Đorđević
  Ivan Dudić
For a list of all FK Jedinstvo Paraćin players with a Wikipedia article, see :Category:FK Jedinstvo Paraćin players.

Managerial history

References

External links
 Club page at Srbijasport

1925 establishments in Serbia
Association football clubs established in 1925
Football clubs in Yugoslavia
Football clubs in Serbia